Demystifying Islam: Tackling the Tough Questions is a 2014 non-fiction book by Harris Zafar.

Overview
Author Harris Zafar addresses common misunderstandings about the Islamic faith and culture for Westerners.

References

External links
Goodreads

2014 non-fiction books
Books about Islam
Books about religion
Rowman & Littlefield books